The forty-eighth edition of the Caribbean Series (Serie del Caribe) baseball tournament was played in 2006 in the neighboring cities of Maracay and Valencia in Venezuela, making it the first one to be played in two cities.  It was held from February 2 through February 7 featuring the champion teams from The Dominican Republic (Licey), Mexico (Mazatlán), Puerto Rico (Carolina) and Venezuela (Caracas). The format consisted of 12 games, each team facing the other teams twice. The games were played at Estadio José Pérez Colmenares (Maracay) and Estadio José Bernardo Pérez (Valencia).

Summary
The Venezuela home team, represented by the Leones del Caracas, won its first Caribbean Series title since 1989 after a dramatic rally with one out in the bottom of the ninth inning led them to a perfect 6-0 finish, the 9th time this had happened in the Series. 

Managed by Carlos Subero, Venezuela outscored their opponents 45–15 while the defense committed only three errors. Triple Crown winner Ramón Hernández was named the Series Most Valuable Player after leading all players with a .542 batting average (13-for-24) and eight RBIs, while tying with Edgar González with three home runs. Hernández also hit for the cycle in Game Two, to become the first player to do it in the Series history. 

Other notable contributions came from Alex Cabrera (.360, 2 HR, 7 RBIs), Álex González (.409, 1 HR, 7 RBIs), Marco Scutaro (.304, 7 runs, 5 RBIs, 2 HR, including a grand slam), Luis Rodríguez (.310, 3 doubles, 5 runs, 8 RBIs) and Franklin Gutiérrez (.364, 4 runs, 4 RBIs). Overall, the Venezuelan club hit .327 with nine home runs. The pitching staff posted a collective 2.62 earned run average and was led by Geremi González, who went 1-0 and topped all pitchers in ERA (1.20) and innings pitched (15), striking out 12 batters while walking just three. 

In addition, Subero, at 33, became the youngest manager to win a Caribbean Series championship. Manny Acta was 34 when he guided the Dominicans to the title in 2004.

The Dominican Republic finished the series in second place with a 4-2 record. Both losses were to Venezuela. The team was managed by Rafael Landestoy and included players as Alexis Gómez, who led his teammates with a .500 BA (10-for-20), and Miguel Tejada (.273, 1 HR, 8 RBIs), Sandy Martínez (.300, 1 HR, 5 RBIs), Napoleón Calzado (.321) and Rafael Belliard (.304, 1 HR).

Puerto Rico was guided by Lino Rivera and finished third at 2-4, both its wins coming against Mexico. Other than starter Willie Collazo (0-1) and relievers Iván Maldonado and Orlando Román, the pitching staff was ineffective. The offense was led by Luis Figueroa (.364, 1 HR, 5 RBIs), Rubén Gotay (.368, 1 HR), Alex Cintrón (.308, 1 HR) and José Valentín (.269, 1 HR).

The defending champion Mexico did not win a game in the series. Managed by Juan José Pacho, it was the fifth time a Mexican team had been held winless in Caribbean Series history. Edgar González led the attack with a .524 BA (11-for-21) and three solo home runs. The team also included veterans players such as Trenidad Hubbard, Oscar Robles and Francisco Campos.

Final standings

Scoreboards

Game 1, February 2 at Maracay

Game 2, February 2 at Valencia

Game 3, February 3 at Valencia

Game 4, February 3 at Maracay

Game 5, February 4 at Valencia

Game 6, February 4 at Valencia

Game 7, February 5 at Maracay

Game 8, February 5 at Maracay

Game 9, February 6 at Maracay

Game 10, February 6 at Valencia

Game 11, February 7 at Valencia

Game 12, February 7 at Maracay

Quotes
"Up to the bag, hits a very high fly, comfortable, to short left field. Back in is the short (stop) Erick Aybar. The ball is coming down and hit Aybar in the head... THE BALL DROPS! THE BALL DROPS! VENEZUELA IS GOING TO WIN! VENEZUELA IS GOING TO WIN! VENEZUELA IS GOING TO WIN!...AND VENEZUELA HAS WON THE CARIBBEAN SERIES, 2006! (Translation of Fox Sports en Español narrator Beto Villa on the final play)

See also
Ballplayers who have played in the Series

Sources
Antero Núñez, José. Series del Caribe. Jefferson, Caracas, Venezuela: Impresos Urbina, C.A., 1987.
Gutiérrez, Daniel. Enciclopedia del Béisbol en Venezuela – 1895-2006 . Caracas, Venezuela: Impresión Arte, C.A., 2007.

External links
Official site
Latino Baseball
Series del Caribe, Las (Spanish)
 
  
  

Caribbean Series
Caribbean Series
International baseball competitions hosted by Venezuela
Sport in Aragua
Sport in Carabobo
2006 in Venezuelan sport
2006 in Caribbean sport
Caribbean Series